Greek Olympics may refer to:

 Ancient Olympic Games held in Greece
 Zappas Olympics, Olympic revival games held in Athens in 1859, 1870, and 1875

Modern Olympics
 1896 Summer Olympics of the I Olympiad
 1906 Intercalated Games
 2004 Summer Olympics of the XXVIII Olympiad